James Chester Elmer (January 21, 1882 – April 30, 1920) was a college football player and once sheriff of Harrison County, Mississippi.

Auburn University
He was a prominent guard and center for the Auburn Tigers of Alabama Polytechnic Institute. The yearbook remarks "The student body thinks "Jimmy Bigs" Elmer is the laziest man in college. [Jimmy, when you show this to Papa, tell him that "Large bodies move slowly."]"

1902
He was selected All-Southern  in 1902. Tradition dictates many publications list Elmer as the school's first All-Southern selection despite the success in 1899 of Arthur Feagin. A report of the 6 to 0 loss to Sewanee reads "Elmer, of Auburn, was the star of the game, his work in the line being remarkable."

University of Virginia

He attended the University of Virginia for a year.

Ole Miss
He continued his legal studies at the University of Mississippi.

1906
In the Egg Bowl of 1906, Elmer's kicking accounted for 13 points in a 29 to 5 rout. Elmer also caught the first forward pass in the history of that rivalry. He was elected All-Southern by former Tennessee player Nash Buckingham in the Memphis Commercial Appeal.

References

1882 births
1920 deaths
American football guards
American football placekickers
Auburn Tigers football players
Ole Miss Rebels football players
Virginia Cavaliers football players
All-Southern college football players
Sportspeople from Biloxi, Mississippi
American football centers
Players of American football from Mississippi